Satya Harischandra is a 1965 Indian Kannada epic film directed by Hunsur Krishnamurthy and produced by K. V. Reddy. It stars Dr. Rajkumar in the lead role, as Harishchandra, an Indian mythological king, who was renowned for upholding truth and justice under any circumstance. The film is based on poet Raghavanka's work, Harishchandra Kavya. The supporting cast features Udaykumar, Pandari Bai, Narasimharaju, M. P. Shankar, K. S. Ashwath and Baby Padmini. This was the second Kannada movie based on king Harishchandra, the first one being the 1943 movie Satya Harishchandra.

K. V. Reddy simultaneously produced a Telugu version of the movie also titled Satya Harishchandra starring N. T. Rama Rao. At the 13th National Film Awards, the film was awarded the President's silver medal for the Best Feature Film in Kannada. The film was hugely successful at the time of its release and is seen as a milestone in Kannada cinema. Satya Harishchandra was the third Indian and the first South Indian film to be digitally coloured. The coloured version, released in April 2008, was a commercial success.

Cast
 Dr. Rajkumar as Harishchandra
 Pandari Bai as Chandramathi
 Udaykumar as Vishvamitra
 Narasimharaju as Nakshatrika
 M. P. Shankar as Veerabaahu
 K. S. Ashwath as Vashistha
 Baby Padmini as Lohitashva
 H. R. Shastry as Gowthama Muni at Indra's court
 M. S. Subbanna as Kalakoushika
 Kupparaju as disciple of Kalakoushika
 Dwarakish as disciple of Kalakoushika
 Ramadevi as Kalaha Kanti, wife of Kalakoushika
 Rathnakar as disciple of Kalakoushika
 L. Vijayalakshmi
 Rajasree
 Meenakumari
 Vanisri, dancer in the song Nanna Neenu ninna naanu

Production
The film was shot mostly shot at the AVM Studios in Madras (now Chennai). Singeetam Srinivasa Rao worked as an assistant director in this movie.

Soundtrack

Pendyala Nageswara Rao composed the soundtrack and lyrics were written by Hunsur Krishnamurthy. The soundtrack album has twenty soundtracks. The song "Kuladalli Keelyavudo" was well received and it was at curtain closing song for most of the stage shows in Karnataka. The song was remixed in 2017 film of same name starring Sharan.

Colourisation
Satya Harishchandra was the third Indian and the first South Indian black-and-white film to be digitally coloured, after Hindi language films, Mughal-e-Azam and Naya Daur. Film producer and distributor K. C. N. Gowda of M/s KCN Enterprises, teamed up with Goldstone Technologies Limited, a California based company to colour the film digitally. C. Jaganmohan, the media division business head of Goldstone Technologies said that each frame in the film was converted to colour. The conversion was from the original 35 mm film to 16 mm film with colour in CinemaScope and DTS sound system. The colourising work was carried out by a team of close to 175 personnel in Hyderabad. The work on sound effect in the dialogues, background music and the musical track in the DTS system was carried out in Chennai. The entire soundtrack of the film digitally restored by music composer, Rajesh Ramanath. The entire project costed an amount of 3 crore.

Re-releases
Prior to the release of its coloured version, the film had been released many times across Karnataka state. The digitally coloured film was re-released for the first time on 24 April 2008, to coincide with the birth anniversary of Rajkumar, in 35 screens across the state. Like each of its previous releases, it completed a 100-day run.

References

External links
 

1960s Kannada-language films
Films about Raja Harishchandra
Indian multilingual films
Indian historical films
Best Kannada Feature Film National Film Award winners
Films scored by Pendyala Nageswara Rao
1960s multilingual films